The Studebaker Power Hawk is a two-door pillared coupe manufactured by the Studebaker-Packard Corporation for the 1956 model year only. The Power Hawk was positioned between the base Flight Hawk pillared coupe and the Sky Hawk pillarless hardtop coupe. The car cost $2,101 before options and weighed 3,095 pounds (1404 kg). Both the Power Hawk and Flight Hawk were dropped at the end of the 1956 model year and replaced with the Studebaker Silver Hawk beginning in 1957. 7,095 were produced in the one year of production.

External links
http://www.1956goldenhawk.com/diffhawk.htm

Power Hawk
Coupés
Cars introduced in 1956